Lady Be Good may refer to:

 Lady, Be Good (musical), a 1924 Broadway musical by George and Ira Gershwin
 "Oh, Lady Be Good!", a song from the above musical
 Lady Be Good (1928 film), a romantic comedy
 Lady Be Good (1941 film), a musical starring Eleanor Powell
 Lady Be Good (aircraft), an American B-24D Liberator bomber of World War II
 Lady Be Good ... For Ella, a 1993 album by Tommy Flanagan

See also 
 Lady Behave!, a 1937 American film directed by Lloyd Corrigan